Pathetic may refer to:

 Pathos, the rhetorical appeal to emotion
 The pathetic fallacy, an over-personification of inanimate objects
 "Pathetic", a song by Blink-182 from their 1997 album  Dude Ranch
 "Pathetic", a song by Lamb of God from their 2006 album Sacrament